Ángel Díaz (né Ángel Paya Díaz; 25 April 1929 Buenos Aires, Argentina – 11 December 1998 Buenos Aires, Argentina) was a Argentine tango singer. In 1945, he joined the Florindo Sassone orchestra – in 1949, Alfredo Gobbi, then Ángel D'Agostino (es), and in 1950, Horacio Salgán, where he remained until 1956.  Díaz composed songs and collaborated with many others.

References 

1929 births
1998 deaths
20th-century Argentine  male singers